Heisey House was the first brick dwelling in Lock Haven, county seat of Clinton County, a city built along the West Branch Canal in the U.S. state of Pennsylvania. Constructed about 1831, the building served as a tavern and inn in its early days, and the town's founder, Jeremiah Church, boarded there.

Heisey House was added to the National Register of Historic Places in 1972.

History
The house was built about 1831 by Dr. John Henderson of Huntington County as a brick Federal farmhouse. The bricks were shipped into town on canal boats.  Henderson was the son-in-law of local landowner John Fleming. Jerry Church, the founder of Lock Haven lived here when the building was used as a tavern. Roger Develing and his son John who immigrated from Ireland owned the tavern. After Church owned the house, Dr. William J. Henderson purchased it in 1852 and practiced medicine there. The Heisey family owned the stucco-covered house from 1875 through 1960, when ownership passed to the Clinton County Historical Society.

The Clinton County Historical Society maintains its headquarters in the 2.5-story building, which it operates as a museum. Substantially unchanged from its mid-19th-century condition, the Victorian interior of the house includes furniture from that era. Local archaeological artifacts are displayed in the house's ice house.

See also
National Register of Historic Places listings in Clinton County, Pennsylvania

References

External links
Clinton County Historical Society

Houses on the National Register of Historic Places in Pennsylvania
Houses completed in 1833
Museums in Clinton County, Pennsylvania
Historic house museums in Pennsylvania
Houses in Clinton County, Pennsylvania
National Register of Historic Places in Clinton County, Pennsylvania
Lock Haven, Pennsylvania